The Bronx is the fourth studio album by punk rock band The Bronx. It was released on February 5, 2013.

Track listing

Personnel
Matt Caughthran - vocals
Joby J. Ford - guitar
Ken Horne - guitar
Brad Magers - bass
Jorma Vik - drums

Charts

References 

2013 albums
The Bronx (band) albums
ATO Records albums
Albums produced by Beau Burchell